The 1958 NAIA World Series was the second annual tournament hosted by the National Association of Intercollegiate Athletics to determine the national champion of baseball among its member colleges and universities in the United States and Canada.

The tournament was played at Kokernot Field in Alpine, Texas, near the campus of Sul Ross State College.

San Diego State defeated Southwestern State (OK) in the championship game, 23–9, to win the Aztecs' first NAIA World Series.

Sul Ross State player Al Miranda, meanwhile, was named tournament MVP.

The tournament field increased by four teams from the inaugural event, growing from eight to twelve teams.

Bracket

Championship bracket

Consolation bracket

See also
 1958 NCAA University Division baseball tournament

Reference

NAIA World Series
NAIA World Series
NAIA World Series